Wilson's long-fingered bat (Miniopterus wilsoni) is a species of bat described in 2020 from Gorongosa National Park in Mozambique. The name M. wilsoni refers to American evolutionary biologist Edward O. Wilson. The species inhabits the mountains of central and northern Mozambique and southern Malawi.

References

Bibliography 

 

Mammals of Malawi
Mammals of Mozambique
Mammals described in 2020
Miniopteridae